The 1959 FA Charity Shield was the 37th FA Charity Shield, an English football match between the winners of the previous season's First Division and FA Cup titles. This year's match was contested by league champions Wolverhampton Wanderers and FA Cup winners Nottingham Forest. 

The match was held at the start of the season for the first time, and was staged at Wolves' stadium, Molineux. The hosts won the game 3–1, giving them their only outright Shield win (in addition to three shared wins).

Match details

References

1959
Charity Shield
Charity Shield 1959
Charity Shield 1959